Yellow mariposa is the common name for a couple of species of California mariposa lilies including:

Calochortus luteus
Calochortus superbus